The 27th Infantry Division "Brescia" was an infantry division of the Royal Italian Army during World War II. The Brescia was named after the city of Brescia in Lombardy. The Brescia was classified as an auto-transportable division, meaning it had some motorized transport, but not enough to move the entire division at once.

The Brescia had its recruiting area and regimental depots in Calabria and its headquarters in Catanzaro. Its two infantry regiments were based in Catanzaro (19th) and Reggio Calabria (20th), with the division's artillery regiment based in Catanzaro. The division's regimental depots were shared with the 61st Infantry Division "Sirte", which was based in Misrata in Libya and recruited its men from and trained them in Calabria. Shortly after its formation the division was sent to Zawiya in Italian Libya. It participated in the Western Desert campaign and was destroyed during the Second Battle of El Alamein.

History 
After the Second Italian War of Independence the Austrian Empire had to cede the Lombardy region of the Kingdom of Lombardy–Venetia to the Kingdom of Sardinia. After taking control of the region the government of Sardinian ordered the Royal Sardinian Army on 29 August 1859 to raise five infantry brigades and one grenadier brigade in Lombardy. Subsequently on 1 November 1859 the Brigade "Brescia" was activated with the re-raised 19th Infantry Regiment and 20th Infantry Regiment.

World War I 
During World War I the brigade fought initially on the Italian front, but in April 1918 it was transferred together with the Brigade "Alpi" Brigade "Napoli", and Brigade "Salerno" to the Western Front in France. There the brigades fought in the Third Battle of the Aisne, Second Battle of the Marne, Battle of Saint-Thierry, and the Hundred Days Offensive.

On 6 November 1926 the brigade assumed the name of XXVII Infantry Brigade with the 16th Infantry Regiment "Savona", 19th Infantry Regiment "Brescia", and 20th Infantry Regiment "Brescia". The brigade was the infantry component of the 27th Territorial Division of Catanzaro, which also included the 55th Artillery Regiment. On 1 January 1935 the division changed its name to 27th Infantry Division "Sila".

Second Italo-Ethiopian War 
The division was sent to Eritrea in late summer 1935 for the Second Italo-Ethiopian War and in October 1935 participated in the capture of Mek'ele. From 4 November 1935 it was stationed in the Adigrat and in December 1936 it fought in the Ādī K’edawīt - Doghea pass area. The division undertook reconnaissance raids towards Ziban Debrī Bota and Celecot. On 19 January 1936 the Sila broke through the Ethiopian defenses and captured several towns in Tembien Province. It did not participate in the nearby First Battle of Tembien and acted only in the final stages of Battle of Amba Aradam, capturing Āmba Ālagē on 26 February 1936. In March 1936, the Sila moved to Finarwa - Sek'ot'a region where it stayed until the end of war.

World War II 
On 27 April 1939 the division transferred the 16th Infantry Regiment "Savona" to the newly activated 55th Infantry Division "Savona" and on the same date the XXVII Infantry Brigade was dissolved with its two remaining regiments coming under direct command of the division, which changed its name to 27th Infantry Division "Brescia". In summer 1939 the division was transferred to Zawiya in Libya. On 12 September 1939 the 48th Infantry Division "Taro" was activated and housed in the barracks of the Brescia in mainland Italy. During the Italian invasion of France from 10-25 June 1940 the Brescia was deployed along the French Tunisian-Libyan border. After the signing of the Franco-Italian Armistice on 24 June 1940 the Brescia returned to its base and took up coastal defense duties to the west of Tripoli.

After the British Western Desert Force had crushed the 10th Army in Eastern Libya during Operation Compass the Brescia's 55th Artillery Regiment "Brescia", the infantry regiments' support weapons companies, and the 27th Anti-tank Company were sent in early January 1941 to shore up the new Italian frontline at Derna and Mechili. The 55th Artillery Regiment and other units of the Brescia fought on the Mechili-Derna line on 25–29 January 1941. After attempts to stop the British offensive failed the units retreated through Marj and Benghazi, but were encircled and destroyed north of Ajdabiya on 5 February 1941.

In early March, 1941 the division consolidated at El Agheila and, together with German forces, started a counter-attack on 24 March 1941, which defeated British troops at Brega on 31 March 1941. The division entered Ajdabiya on 2 April 1941 and was tasked with the defense of the Axis communication lines. In April 1941 the division received the 1st Fast Artillery Regiment from the 1st Cavalry Division "Eugenio di Savoia" to replace the destroyed 55th Artillery Regiment "Brescia".

Siege of Tobruk 
On 12 April 1941 Italian and German forces commenced the Siege of Tobruk and the Brescia together with the German 3rd Reconnaissance Battalion of the 21st Panzer Division advanced to the port of Bardia, where several hundred British prisoners and a large quantity of allied materiel was taken. As the attack on Tobruk was stalling and General Erwin Rommel was forced to command the Brescia to return to reinforce the siege of Tobruk. During the night of 30 April 1941 an Italo-German force attacked the Tobruk defenses and the 132nd Armored Division "Ariete" and the Brescia captured seven strong points (R2, R3, R4, R5, R6, R7 and R8). During the night of 3 May the Australians counterattacked, but the Italian 102nd Motorized Division "Trento" and 17th Infantry Division "Pavia" and German panzergrenadiers repelled the attack On the night of 16 May the Brescia retaliated with the help of two platoons of the XXXII Mixed Engineer Battalion and breached the defensive perimeter of the Australian 2/9th and 2/10th Battalions. With the obstacles removed, the Brescia troops captured the strongoints S8, S9 and S10. The Australians fought back and the commanding officer of the XXXII Mixed Engineer Battalion Colonel Emilio Caizzo was killed during a satchel attack and awarded posthumously Italy's highest military honor the Gold Medal of Military Valour. Among the objectives initially selected during the planning of the British offensive Operation Brevity was the recapture of S8 and S9.

On 24 May the Brescia, which had taken over the western front of Tobruk, repelled an attacking Australian infantry force, which was supported by tanks. On 2 August, another attack was launched to recover the lost strong points, but the attacking forces from the Australian 2/43rd Battalion and 2/28th Battalions were repulsed. This was the last Australian effort to recover the lost fortifications.

Operation Crusader 
On 27 November 1941 the British offensive Operation Crusader reached the siege ring around Tobruk and for the next 13 days the battled to break the siege raged. The Brescia, as part of the besieging forces, held out with the other Axis forces until 8-9 December 1941, when the order to retreat to Ain el Gazala was given. The Brescia's last action at Tobruk was a fight with the British 70th Division and Polish Carpathian Rifle Brigade for control of the White Knoll position.

On 11 December a retreating battalion of the Brescia came within 50 yards of the 23rd New Zealand Battalion and was cut down by machine gun fire. The Axis forces retreated to Ain el Gazala, where on 15 December, the Brescia held its ground against the 2nd New Zealand Division and Carpathian Rifle Brigade, allowing a strong Italo-German armored force to counterattack and overrun the 1st British Battalion, The Buffs.. On 18 December British forces outflanked the Brescia in the south and so the division had to retreat to Ajdabiya, where it arrived on 22 December 1941.

Battle of Gazala 
In January 1942 the Brescia was defending a front around Qabr al Fārigh, south-west of Derna. It moved its positions forward to Qabr al Fārigh (south of Derna, Libya in April 1942. During the Battle of Gazala, the Brescia played an important role in the capture of 6,000 prisoners on 16 June 1942, after the 101st Motorized Division "Trieste" and 15th Panzer Division had destroyed the British 2nd and 4th Armoured Brigades. operating at Ghawţ al ‘Abīdī depression.

Battle of Mersa Matruh 
After the successful Battle of Gazala the Brescia advanced, passing to the south of Tobruk on 20 June 1942 and continuing through Bardia, As Sallūm and Sidi Barrani, the division arrived in Mersa Matruh on 29 June 1942. During the brief siege of Mersa Matruh in June 1942 Axis forces captured 6,000 British troops and large quantities of supplies.

First and Second Battles of El Alamein 

During the initial stages of the First Battle of El Alamein in July 1942 the Brescia was deployed on the El Mreir ridge and repelled a strong attack of the 5th New Zealand Infantry Brigade. Later, during the defense of Ruweisat Ridge, the 19th Infantry Regiment of the Brescia put up a tenacious defense, losing a battalion and three company commanders in this night action, before being partly overrun at dawn on 15 July, delaying the Allied advance long enough for German armored forces to launch a devastating counterattack. Between 21 and 27 July 1942 British counter-attacks were so ferocious that the Brescia was forced end its advance to the south of El Alamein.

During the Second Battle of El Alamein the Brescia held its positions against British armored attacks from 24 October to 4 November 1942. When the order was given to withdraw the Brescia retreated along the Deir Sha'la - Fukah route. The lack of transport resulted in Allied units catching up and annihilating the Brescia on 7 November 1942, within the sight of Fukah, where other shattered Axis units has already gathered. The division was officially dissolved on 25 November 1942.

Organization

Second Italo-Ethiopian War 1935-36 
 27th Infantry Division "Sila"
 XXVII Infantry Brigade
 16th Infantry Regiment "Savona"
 19th Infantry Regiment "Brescia"
 20th Infantry Regiment "Brescia"
 12th Artillery Regiment (3x artillery groups with 75/13 field guns)
 XXVII Machine Gun Battalion
 XXVII Replacements Battalion
 12th Engineer Company
 27th Signal Company
 Divisional Services

World War II 1940-42 

  27th Infantry Division "Brescia", in Catanzaro
 19th Infantry Regiment "Brescia", in Catanzaro
 Command Company
 3x Fusilier battalions
 Support Weapons Company (65/17 infantry support guns; destroyed on 5 February 1941)
 Support Weapons Company/ 34th Infantry Regiment/ 4th Infantry Division "Livorno" (65/17 infantry support guns; replaced the destroyed Support Weapons Company)
 Mortar Company (81mm Mod. 35 mortars)
 20th Infantry Regiment "Brescia", in Reggio Calabria
 Command Company
 3x Fusilier battalions
 Support Weapons Company (65/17 infantry support guns; destroyed on 5 February 1941)
 Support Weapons Company/ 38th Infantry Regiment/ 3rd Infantry Division "Ravenna" (65/17 infantry support guns; replaced the destroyed Support Weapons Company)
 Mortar Company (81mm Mod. 35 mortars)
 55th Artillery Regiment "Brescia", in Catanzaro (destroyed on 5 February 1941)
 Command Unit
 I Group (100/17 howitzers)
 II Group (75/27 field guns)
 III Group (75/27 field guns)
 27th Anti-aircraft Battery (20/65 Mod. 35 anti-aircraft guns)
 Ammunition and Supply Unit
 1st Fast Artillery Regiment (replaced the destroyed 55th Artillery Regiment "Brescia")
 Command Unit
 I Group (100/17 howitzers)
 II Group (100/17 howitzers)
 III Group (75/27 howitzers)
 IV Group (75/27) howitzers)
 V Group (8.8 cm Flak 37, joined the regiment in May 1942)
 401st Anti-aircraft Battery (20/65 Mod. 35 anti-aircraft guns)
 404th Anti-aircraft Battery (20/65 Mod. 35 anti-aircraft guns)
 502th Anti-aircraft Battery (20/65 Mod. 35 anti-aircraft guns)
 Ammunition and Supply Unit
 XXVII Machine Gun Battalion
 XXVII Mixed Engineer Battalion
 27th Telegraph and Radio Operators Company
 82nd Engineer Company
 27th Anti-tank Company (47/32 anti-tank guns; destroyed on 5 February 1941)
 227th Anti-tank Company (47/32 anti-tank guns; replaced the destroyed 27th Anti-tank Company)
 34th Medical Section
 95th Field Hospital
 1x Field hospital
 35th Surgical unit
 34th Supply Section
 328th Transport Section
 127th Carabinieri Section
 96th Field Post Office

The following units were attached to the division during the Western Desert Campaign:
 5th Anti-tank Company (47/32 anti-tank guns)
 71st Anti-tank Company (47/32 anti-tank guns)

Military honors 
For their conduct during the Western Desert campaign the President of Italy awarded on 7 December 1951 to the division's two infantry regiments and the 1st Fast Artillery Regiment Italy's highest military honor, the Gold Medal of Military Valour.

  19th Infantry Regiment "Brescia" on 7 December 1951
  20th Infantry Regiment "Brescia" on 7 December 1951
  1st Fast Artillery Regiment on 7 December 1951

Commanding officers 
The division's commanding officers were:

 Generale di Divisione Giuseppe Cremascoli (24 May 1939 - 8 February 1941, died of disease 9 April 1941)
 Colonel Domenico Canistrà (acting, 9-21 February 1942)
 Generale di Divisione Bortolo Zambon (22 February 1941 - 10 October 1941)
 Generale di Divisione Benvenuto Gioda (acting, 11 October 1941 - 1 January 1942
 Generale di Brigata Giacomo Lombardi (2 January 1942 - 16 July 1942, WIA)
 Generale di Divisione Dino Parri (17 July 1942 - 15 August 1942)
 Generale di Divisione Giovanni Battista Oxilia (16 August 1942 - 8 September 1942)
 Generale di Divisione Alessandro Predieri (9 September 1942 - 13 October 1942, KIA)
 Generale di Divisione Brunetto Brunetti (14 October 1942 - 5 November 1942, POW)

References

External links
  1940 Truck-Moveable Divisions

Infantry divisions of Italy in World War II
Military units and formations established in 1935
Military units and formations disestablished in 1942